Jeff Newman may refer to:

Jeff Newman (baseball), American baseball player
Jeff Newman (musician), pedal steel guitar player and Nashville session musician
Jeff Newman (TV personality), TV personality on TVW-7 in Perth, Western Australia